George Warrington "G. W." Steevens (10 December 1869 – 15 January 1900) was a British journalist and writer.

Life
Steevens was born in Sydenham, and educated at the City of London School and Balliol College, Oxford. He was elected a fellow of Pembroke College, Oxford, in 1893 and also spent some time at Cambridge where he edited a weekly periodical.

As a journalist, he distinguished himself by his clearness of vision and vivid style, and was connected successively with the National Observer,  The Pall Mall Gazette, and, from 1896, the Daily Mail.

He was the most famous war correspondent of his time, before being eclipsed by the daring escape of young Churchill from a Pretoria prison. Steevens utilised the articles which appeared in these and other publications in various books, such as Monologues of the Dead (1895), The Land of the Dollar (America) (1897), With the Conquering Turk (1897), With Kitchener to Khartum, chronicling his attachment to British forces during the Mahdist War in the Sudan, The Tragedy of Dreyfus and his posthumous From Cape Town to Ladysmith. He is also the author of In India, a series of articles on India published in 1899.

He was appointed by the Daily Mail as war correspondent to South Africa during the Second Boer War in 1899. Caught in the siege of Ladysmith, he kept up morale during the early months with his mordant witticisms appearing in Ladysmith Lyre (e.g. "a strange sideway out of Ladysmith" for death by disease or starvation). He died of enteric fever (now more commonly known as typhoid) on 15 January 1900, six weeks before the Natal Field Army of Redvers Buller relieved Ladysmith.

In popular culture 
Jack London credited Stevens with inventing the cocktail Abu Hamed in the opening paragraph of "The Inevitable White Man"

References

Sources

External links

 
 
The Land of the Dollar, Ayer Publishing, 1971
, An Unfinished Record of the South African War

1869 births
1900 deaths
English atheists
People from Sydenham, London
English war correspondents
British people of the Mahdist War
English male journalists
English non-fiction writers
People educated at the City of London School
Deaths from typhoid fever
Infectious disease deaths in South Africa
Second Boer War casualties
Alumni of Balliol College, Oxford
19th-century British journalists
English male non-fiction writers
Daily Mail journalists
War correspondents of the Second Boer War